The yellow tang (Zebrasoma flavescens) is a saltwater fish species of the family Acanthuridae. It is one of the most popular marine aquarium fish. It is bright yellow in color, and it lives in reefs. The yellow tang spawn around a full moon. The yellow tang eats algae. The yellow tang has a white barb, located just before the tail fin, to protect itself.

Taxonomy and etymology
The yellow tang was first described by English naturalist Edward Turner Bennett as Acanthurus flavescens in 1828 from a collection in the Hawaiian Islands. Zebrasoma refers to the body and the zebra-like stripes or bars on the body of other fish in the genus. Its species name is the Latin adjective flavescens which refers to the tang's yellow color.

Yellow tangs are in the surgeonfish family.

Evolution and genetics 
Based on the gene Cytochrome C-oxidase 1 (CO1), a group of researchers was able to reconstruct the phylogenetic tree of the genus Zebrasoma with mitochondrial barcoding sequences.

Description and biology
Adult males tend to be larger than females. Yellow tangs are bright yellow in color. At night, the yellow coloring fades slightly, and a prominent brownish patch develops in the middle with a horizontal white band. They rapidly regain their bright yellow color during daylight. They can be aggressive, are prone to marine ich, and may damage coral within a reef tank. Male and female yellow tang look very similar. When mating, however, males change color and have a "shimmering" behavior which makes them identifiable. The yellow tang has 5 dorsal spines along with 23–26 dorsal soft rays. The yellow tang also has 3 anal spines as well as 19–22 anal soft rays. There is a white spine on its caudal peduncle that it can use for defense. Its snout is moderately protruding. Its mouth is small with spatulate teeth that are place classed relatively close together inside of the yellow tang's mouth. In juveniles, there are 12 upper and 14 lower teeth. In adults, there are 18 upper and 22 lower teeth.

The yellow tang is a marine fish that lives in reefs. The yellow tang is found by itself or in very small groups/schools. The yellow tang is mainly herbivorous and eats filamentous algae.

Reproduction 
Spawning happens throughout the year, and it peaks once. Spawning normally happens around the time the moon is full, so this suggests there is some sort of lunar periodicity going on. Spawning happens in pairs or groups, and fertilization is external. Eggs are left in open water and yellow tang are substratum egg scatterers. Yellow tang do not guard their eggs, and once the eggs hatch the juveniles receive no parental care.

Food
In the wild, yellow tangs feed on benthic turf algae and other marine plant material. In captivity, they are commonly fed meat/fish-based aquarium food, but the long-term health effects of this diet are questionable. However, most experts in the marine aquarium industry express little scepticism that such a well rounded and balanced diet including plant and animal material would be in any way detrimental to mostly herbivorous fishes like tangs since they still need on occasion, complex amino acids and nutrients that only ocean animals can provide. In the wild, yellow tangs provide cleaner services to marine turtles, by removing algal growth from their shells.

Distribution and habitat
There have also been reports that they have been found off the coast of Florida in the Western Central Atlantic. A single specimen was filmed in the Mediterranean Sea in spanish waters in 2008, a likely aquarium release. 

Hawaii was the most common place for aquarium harvesting, prior to the export ban, where up to 70% of the yellow tangs for the aquarium industry were sourced from. Over 70% of the yellow tang's natural range is protected from collection and fishing. The yellow tang is listed as "Least Concern" by the International Union for Conservation of Nature (IUCN).

Predators and other threats 
The yellow tang has many natural predators, including larger fish, sharks, crabs, and octopuses. Another threat is habitat destruction that is caused by humans. Examples of habitat destruction caused by humans are pollution that started on land and flows into the water, physical damage and destruction from harmful fishing practices, as well as overfishing, coral harvesting, and snorkeling, which can potentially cause reef damage.

Conservation status 
Conservation status is labelled as least concern, but there are many ways yellow tang are being protected. The most prominent is that yellow tangs are being bred in captivity for aquarium use now more than they were, so collecting yellow tang from the ocean has decreased sharply. This allows wild yellow tang to be able to thrive without too many being taken, so the species is more likely to survive.

In 2010, one study found that fish larvae can drift on ocean currents and reseed fish stocks at a distant location. This finding demonstrated that fish populations can be connected to distant locations through the process of larval drift. They investigated the yellow tang, because larva of this species stay in the general area of the reef in which they first settle. The tropical yellow tang is heavily fished by the aquarium trade. By the late 1990s, their stocks were collapsing. Nine MPAs were established off the coast of Hawaii to protect them. Larval drift has helped them establish themselves in different locations, and the fishery is recovering. "We've clearly shown that fish larvae that were spawned inside marine reserves can drift with currents and replenish fished areas long distances away," said coauthor Mark Hixon.

In the aquarium
The yellow tang is very commonly kept as a saltwater aquarium fish. In 2015, researchers successfully bred them in captivity. Captive-bred yellow tangs are now routinely available for purchase at fish stores and online vendors. Life expectancy in the wild can exceed 30 years.

Prior to January 2021 the Yellow Tangs were commonly selling for around $65 to $70 in the USA. However, after a collection ban in Hawaii, the prices have more than quadrupled to over $400.

References

External links 
 

Fish of Thailand
Acanthuridae
Fish of Hawaii
Fish described in 1828
Articles containing video clips